The May Bumps 2019 was a series of rowing races at Cambridge University from Wednesday 12 June 2019 to Saturday 15 June 2019. The event was run as a bumps race and was the 128th set of races in the series of May Bumps which have been held annually in mid-June in this form since 1887.

Head of the River crews

 Starting in 2nd position,  bumped  women on the second night to claim Mays headship for the first time since 2003. This is Newnham's first 'Double Headship', meaning they hold Headship in both the Lent and May Bumps in the same year.

Highest 2nd VIIIs

  bumped ,  and  before rowing over on the fourth night, securing W2 headship at 5th in the second division.

Links to races in other years

Bumps Charts

Below are the bumps charts for all 4 men's and all 4 women's divisions, with the men's event on the left and women's event on the right. The bumps chart shows the progress of every crew over all four days of the racing. To follow the progress of any particular crew, find the crew's name on the left side of the chart and follow the line to the end-of-the-week finishing position on the right of the chart.

This chart may not be displayed correctly if you are using a large font size on your browser. A simple way to check is to see that the first horizontal bold line, marking the boundary between divisions, lies between positions 17 and 18.

References 

2019 in rowing
May Bumps results
2019 in English sport